The 1929 Mecklenburg-Schwerin state election was held on 23 June 1929 to elect the 51 members of the Landtag of the Free State of Mecklenburg-Schwerin.

Results

References 

Mecklenburg-Schwerin
Elections in Mecklenburg-Western Pomerania